Alexander Rae Baldwin III (born April 3, 1958) is an American actor, comedian, and producer. In his early career, Baldwin played both leading and supporting roles in a variety of films such as Tim Burton's Beetlejuice (1988), Mike Nichols' Working Girl (1988), Jonathan Demme's Married to the Mob (1988), and Oliver Stone's Talk Radio (1988). He gained attention for his performances in The Hunt for Red October (1990) as Jack Ryan and in Glengarry Glen Ross (1992). Since then he has worked with directors such as Woody Allen in Alice (1990), To Rome with Love (2012) and Blue Jasmine (2013), and Martin Scorsese in The Aviator (2004) and The Departed (2006). His performance in the drama The Cooler (2003) garnered him a nomination for the Academy Award for Best Supporting Actor. He has done voice work for The SpongeBob SquarePants Movie (2004), Madagascar: Escape 2 Africa (2008), Rise of the Guardians (2012), and The Boss Baby film franchise (2017–2022).

From 2006 to 2013, Baldwin received critical acclaim starring alongside Tina Fey as Jack Donaghy on the NBC sitcom 30 Rock, winning two Primetime Emmy Awards, three Golden Globe Awards, and seven Screen Actors Guild Awards for his work on the series, making him the male performer with the most SAG Awards in history. On stage, he portrayed Stanley Kowalski in the 1992 Broadway production of A Streetcar Named Desire and the title character in a 1998 Off-Broadway production of Macbeth, the former earning him a Tony Award nomination. Baldwin co-starred in Mission: Impossible – Rogue Nation (2015) and Mission: Impossible – Fallout (2018), the fifth and sixth installments of the Mission: Impossible series. He is also a columnist for The Huffington Post. He also was the host of Match Game from 2016 until 2021.

Baldwin has received critical acclaim for his portrayal of Donald Trump on the long-running sketch series Saturday Night Live, both during the latter part of the 2016 presidential election campaign and following the inauguration, a role that won him his third Primetime Emmy in 2017. He was nominated again in 2018 and 2021.

In 2021, while on the Rust film set, Baldwin discharged a revolver used as a prop, which killed cinematographer Halyna Hutchins and injured director Joel Souza. On January 31, 2023, Baldwin was criminally charged by the Santa Fe County, New Mexico, district attorney's office with two counts of involuntary manslaughter.

Early life
Alexander Rae Baldwin III was born on April 3, 1958, in Amityville, New York, and raised in the Nassau Shores neighborhood of nearby Massapequa, the eldest son of Carol Newcomb (née Martineau; December 15, 1929 – May 26, 2022) from Syracuse and Alexander Rae Baldwin Jr. (October 26, 1927 – April 15, 1983), a high school history/social studies teacher and football coach from Brooklyn. He has three younger brothers, Daniel (born 1960), William (born 1963), and Stephen (born 1966), who also became actors. He also has two sisters, Elizabeth "Beth" Baldwin Keuchler (born 1955) and Jane Ann Baldwin Sasso (born 1965).

Alec and his siblings were raised as Roman Catholics. They are of Irish, French, and English ancestry. Through his father, Baldwin is descended from Mayflower passenger John Howland, and through this line, is the 13th generation of his family born in North America and the 14th generation to live in North America.

Baldwin attended Alfred G. Berner High School in Massapequa and played football there under Coach Bob Reifsnyder. In New York City, Baldwin worked as a busboy at the famed discotheque, Studio 54. From 1976 to 1979, he attended George Washington University. In 1979, he lost the election for student body president and received a personal letter from former U.S. president Richard Nixon (with whom he had a common friend) encouraging him to use the loss as a learning experience.

Afterward, he transferred to the Tisch School of the Arts of New York University (NYU) where he studied with, among others, Geoffrey Horne and Mira Rostova at the Lee Strasberg Theatre Institute. Later, he was accepted as a member of the Actors Studio. In 1994, he completed his Bachelor of Fine Arts degree at NYU.

Career

Theatre
Baldwin made his Broadway debut in 1986 in a revival of Joe Orton's Loot alongside Zoë Wanamaker, Željko Ivanek, Joseph Maher, and Charles Keating. This production closed after three months. His other Broadway credits include Caryl Churchill's Serious Money with Kate Nelligan and a revival of Tennessee Williams' A Streetcar Named Desire, for which his performance as Stanley Kowalski garnered a Tony Award nomination for Best Actor. Baldwin also received an Emmy nomination for the 1995 television version of the production, in which both he and Jessica Lange reprised their roles, alongside John Goodman and Diane Lane. In 1998, Baldwin played the title role in Macbeth at The Public Theater alongside Angela Bassett and Liev Schreiber in a production directed by George C. Wolfe. In 2004, Baldwin starred in a revival of Broadway's Twentieth Century about a successful and egomaniacal Broadway director (Baldwin), who has transformed a chorus girl (Anne Heche) into a leading lady.

On June 9, 2005, he appeared in a concert version of the Rodgers and Hammerstein musical South Pacific at Carnegie Hall. He starred as Luther Billis, alongside Reba McEntire as Nellie and Brian Stokes Mitchell as Emile. The production was taped and telecast by PBS on April 26, 2006. In 2006, Baldwin made theater news in Roundabout Theatre Company's Off-Broadway revival of Joe Orton's Entertaining Mr. Sloane. In 2010, Baldwin starred opposite Sam Underwood in a critically acclaimed revival of Peter Shaffer's Equus, directed by Tony Walton at Guild Hall in East Hampton, New York.

Baldwin returned to Broadway as Harold in Orphans. The show, which opened April 18, 2013, was also to have starred Shia LaBeouf as Treat, but LaBeouf left the production in rehearsals and was replaced by Ben Foster.

Television

Baldwin's first acting role was as Billy Aldrich in the NBC daytime soap opera The Doctors from 1980 to 1982. In the fall 1983, he starred in the short-lived television series Cutter to Houston. He went on to appear as the brother of Valene Ewing and son of Lilimae Clements (played by Joan Van Ark and Julie Harris, respectively) in Knots Landing from 1984 to 1985. In 1986 Baldwin starred in Dress Gray, a four-hour made-for-television miniseries, as an honest cadet sergeant who tries to solve the mystery of a murdered gay classmate. In 1998 he became the third narrator and George Carlin's replacement for the fifth and sixth seasons of Thomas & Friends. In 2000 he starred in "Thomas and the Magic Railroad" as Mr. Conductor. He left the show in 2002 after winning the role of Lawrence Quinn in The Cat in the Hat and was replaced by Michael Brandon.

In 2002, Baldwin appeared in two episodes of Friends as Phoebe's overly enthusiastic love interest, Parker. He also portrayed a recurring character in several seasons 7 and 8 episodes of Will & Grace, in which he played Malcolm, a "top secret agent" and the lover of Karen Walker (Megan Mullally). He also guest-starred in the first live episode of the series. Baldwin wrote an episode of Law & Order entitled "Tabloid", which aired in 1998. He played Dr. Barrett Moore, a retired plastic surgeon, in the series Nip/Tuck.

He starred as Jack Donaghy on NBC's 30 Rock, which first aired in October 2006. He met his future co-stars Tina Fey and Tracy Morgan while appearing on Saturday Night Live. Since season 3, Baldwin was credited as one of 30 Rocks producers. Baldwin has won three Emmy Awards, two Golden Globe awards and seven Screen Actors Guild Awards for his role. He received his second Emmy nomination for Best Actor in a Television Comedy or Musical as Jack Donaghy in 2008, marking his seventh Primetime Emmy nomination and first win. He won again in 2009.
Baldwin joined TCM's The Essentials Robert Osborne as co-host beginning in March 2009. In 2009, he appeared in a series of commercials for Hulu that premiered during the Super Bowl broadcast. In 2010, he made a five-second cameo appearance with comedian Andy Samberg in a musical video titled "Great Day" featured on the bonus DVD as part of Lonely Island's album Turtleneck & Chain.

Baldwin co-hosted the 82nd Academy Awards with Steve Martin in 2010. He has hosted Saturday Night Live 17 times , and holds the record for most times hosting the show. He also impersonated Republican nominee Donald Trump during SNL coverage of the 2016 Presidential election, to critical acclaim. In 2017, he won a Primetime Emmy for his portrayal of Trump. Baldwin continued in the role until Trump's defeat in the 2020 election.

Beginning in 2010, Baldwin appeared in a television campaign for Capital One as their spokesperson. Following his 2013 confrontation with a videographer reported by TMZ, his contract was not renewed, and he was succeeded in the campaign by Jennifer Garner.

On February 4, 2012, he hosted the 2011 NFL Honors awards show. He later hosted the second show on February 2, 2013.

In 2013 Baldwin briefly hosted Up Late with Alec Baldwin on MSNBC. On November 26, 2013, the program was cancelled after only five episodes, due in part to a street tirade captured on video. TMZ claimed Baldwin's insult toward the videographer was "cocksucking fag". Baldwin, who denied that he used the word "fag", later cited this incident as a major turning point in his public life.

In 2016 Baldwin began hosting a reboot of the game show Match Game on ABC. In 2017, he took over as sole host of TCM's The Essentials following the death of his co-host, Robert Osborne.

In August 2017, Baldwin's production company, El Dorado Pictures, signed a first-look deal with ABC Studios.

On March 3, 2018, following the broadcast of the 90th Academy Awards, ABC broadcast a preview episode of the talk show The Alec Baldwin Show, at the time called Sundays With Alec Baldwin, scheduled to formally debut with a nine-episode order that fall.

Baldwin was the subject of the 2019 edition of the Comedy Central Roast, which included among the roastees a surprise appearance by his daughter Ireland.

In 2021, Baldwin starred opposite Jamie Dornan and Christian Slater in the miniseries Dr. Death on Peacock.

Film

Baldwin made his film debut with a minor role in the 1987 film Forever, Lulu. In 1988, he appeared in Beetlejuice and Working Girl. He gained further recognition as a leading man with his role as Jack Ryan in The Hunt for Red October (1990). That same year, he also starred in the black comedy crime film Miami Blues alongside Jennifer Jason Leigh and Fred Ward.

Baldwin met his future wife Kim Basinger when they played lovers in the 1991 film The Marrying Man. Next, Baldwin played a ferocious sales executive in Glengarry Glen Ross (1992), a part added to the film version of David Mamet's Pulitzer Prize-winning stage play (including the monologue "Coffee's for closers").

Later that same year, he starred in Prelude to a Kiss with Meg Ryan, which was based on the Broadway play. The film received a lukewarm reception by critics and grossed only $22 million worldwide. He appeared with Basinger again in The Getaway, a 1994 remake of the 1972 Steve McQueen film of the same name.

Also, in 1994, Baldwin made a foray into pulp fiction-based movies with the role of the title character in The Shadow. The film made $48 million. In 1996 and 1997 he starred in several more thrillers, including The Edge, The Juror, and Heaven's Prisoners.

Baldwin shifted towards character acting, beginning with Pearl Harbor in 2001. He played Lt. Col. James Doolittle in the film. With a worldwide box office of $449,220,945, this film remains the highest-grossing film Baldwin has appeared in during his acting career. Baldwin was nominated for an Academy Award, a Golden Globe, and the Screen Actors Guild Award for his performance in the 2003 gambling drama The Cooler.

He appeared in Martin Scorsese's The Aviator (2004) and The Departed (2006). In 2006, he starred in the film Mini's First Time. He performed opposite Sarah Michelle Gellar in Suburban Girl (2007). Two years later, he co-starred in the hit romantic comedy It's Complicated with Meryl Streep and Steve Martin.

Baldwin directed and starred in The Devil and Daniel Webster with Anthony Hopkins, Jennifer Love Hewitt and Dan Aykroyd in 2001. The then-unreleased film became an asset in a federal bank fraud trial when investor Jed Barron was convicted of bank fraud while the movie was in production. The film was eventually acquired by The Yari Group without Baldwin's involvement.

In 2007, the Yari Film Group announced that it would give the film, now titled Shortcut to Happiness, a theatrical release in the spring, and cable film network Starz! announced that it had acquired pay TV rights for the film. Shortcut to Happiness was finally released in 2008. Baldwin, displeased with the way the film had been cut in post-production, demanded that his directorial credit be changed to the pseudonym "Harry Kirkpatrick".

Baldwin co-starred in Mission: Impossible – Rogue Nation, the fifth installment of the Mission: Impossible series, released on July 31, 2015, and reprised the role in Mission: Impossible – Fallout, released on July 27, 2018.

On August 27, 2018, it was announced that Baldwin would join the cast for Joker, playing Thomas Wayne, father of Bruce Wayne. Later, on August 29, 2018, Baldwin withdrew from the role. That same year, Baldwin made cameo appearances in the Best Picture-nominated films BlacKkKlansman and A Star Is Born as Dr. Kennebrew Beaureguard and himself, respectively.

Radio and podcasts
On January 12, 2009, Baldwin became the host of The New York Philharmonic This Week, the nationally syndicated radio series of the New York Philharmonic. He has recorded two nationally distributed public service radio announcements on behalf of the Save the Manatee Club.

On October 24, 2011, WNYC public radio released the first episode of Baldwin's podcast Here's the Thing, a series of interviews with public figures including artists, policy-makers, and performers. The first two episodes featured actor Michael Douglas and political consultant Ed Rollins. Between 2011 and 2020, Baldwin completed more than 150 interviews, with guests who included musician Wynton Marsalis, filmmaker Edward Norton, comedian David Letterman, violinist Itzhak Perlman, and pianist Lang Lang, among many others. Here's the Thing was developed for Baldwin by Lu Olkowski, Trey Kay, Kathy Russo, and Emily Botein.

Books
Baldwin co-authored the book A Promise to Ourselves: A Journey Through Fatherhood and Divorce with Mark Tabb in 2008. His 2017 memoir Nevertheless debuted at No. 5 on The New York Times hardcover nonfiction best-seller list.

Philanthropy
Baldwin, along with his mother Carol, created the Carol M. Baldwin Cancer Research Fund. This led to the Carol M. Baldwin Breast Care Center at the Stony Brook University Hospital to be named in her honor.

During his 2010–2013 stint as a spokesperson for Capital One, Baldwin's contract was written to fund Baldwin's charity foundation. He was paid $15 million over nearly five years. After taxes and accounting fees, the remainder, $14.125 million, was given to charity.

In March 2011, Baldwin donated $1 million to the New York Philharmonic (on whose board he served), and $500,000 to the Roundabout Theatre Company, where he has performed plays in New York. In recent years, his foundation has donated bookstore gift certificates to Long Island libraries to support literacy programs.

Filmography

Awards and honors

Baldwin has also received a number of awards and nominations throughout his career for stage, television, and film roles. He has been nominated for the Academy Award, BAFTA Award, and Tony Award and has received three Primetime Emmy Awards, three Golden Globe Awards, and eight Screen Actors Guild Awards.

On May 12, 2010, Baldwin gave a commencement address at New York University and was awarded a Doctor of Fine Arts degree, honoris causa.

Baldwin was named Esteemed Faculty by Stony Brook University after teaching a master class in acting at Stony Brook Southampton.

Personal life

Marriages

Kim Basinger

In May 1990, Baldwin met actress Kim Basinger when they played lovers in the film The Marrying Man. They married on August 19, 1993, and had a daughter, Ireland (born October 23, 1995). They separated on December 5, 2000 and divorced on September 3, 2002.

Baldwin has called the attorneys in the case "opportunists", and has characterized Basinger's psychologists as part of the "divorce industry". He has faulted them more than Basinger and writes, "In fact, I blame my ex-wife least of all for what has transpired. She is a person, like many of us, doing the best she can with what she has. She is a litigant, and therefore, one who walks into a courtroom and is never offered anything other than what is served there. Nothing off the menu, ever."

Baldwin wrote that he spent over a million dollars, has had to put time aside from his career, has had to travel extensively, and needed to find a house in California (he lived in New York), so that he could stay in his daughter's life.

Baldwin contended that after seven years of these issues, he hit a breaking point and, on April 11, 2007, left an angry voicemail message in response to another unanswered arranged call, in which Baldwin called his 11-year-old daughter a "rude, thoughtless little pig". He contends that the tape was sold to TMZ, which released the recording, despite laws against publishing media related to a minor without the permission of both parents. Baldwin admitted that he made a mistake but asked not to be judged as a parent based on a bad moment. He later admitted to Playboy in June 2009 that he contemplated suicide over the voicemail that leaked to the public. Of the incident, he said, "I spoke to a lot of professionals, who helped me. If I committed suicide, [Kim Basinger] would have considered that a victory. Destroying me was their avowed goal."

In late 2008, Baldwin toured in support of his book on fatherhood and divorce, speaking about his experiences related in it.

Hilaria Baldwin

By August 2011, Baldwin began dating Hilaria Thomas, a yoga instructor with Yoga Vida in Manhattan. Baldwin and Thomas moved from the Upper West Side to Greenwich Village that August. The couple became engaged in April 2012 and married on June 30, 2012, at St. Patrick's Old Cathedral in New York City. They have seven children together.

1995 photographer incident 
On October 26, 1995, Baldwin allegedly assaulted a photographer for videotaping Basinger and their three-day-old daughter. The couple was returning from the hospital and was confronted by the photographer outside their Los Angeles home. Whoopi Goldberg praised Baldwin for his actions during her opening monologue while hosting the 68th Academy Awards.

2011 plane incident
In December 2011, Baldwin was on an American Airlines flight at Los Angeles International Airport, playing Words with Friends on his phone while waiting for takeoff. When instructed to put away the "electronic device" by the flight attendant, he reportedly became belligerent and was eventually removed from the plane. He later publicly apologized to the passengers who were delayed. The incident was humorously referenced in the following months in TV commercials for Capital One credit cards and Best Buy electronics stores. Baldwin also spoofed the incident during a cameo appearance on Saturday Night Live "Weekend Update" segment.

2021 shooting incident 

On October 21, 2021, Baldwin was filming on the set of the upcoming film Rust, of which he was also a producer, at the Bonanza Creek Ranch in Santa Fe, New Mexico, when he discharged a gun being used as a prop, killing cinematographer Halyna Hutchins and injuring director Joel Souza. The Hutchins family filed a wrongful death suit against Baldwin for his part in the fatal shooting. On October 5, 2022, Baldwin reached an undisclosed settlement with Hutchins' family in their wrongful death lawsuit. 

On January 19, 2023, Santa Fe District Attorney Mary Carmack-Altwies announced that Baldwin would be charged with two counts of involuntary manslaughter by the end of the month. He was charged on January 31, 2023. Critics noted that the elevated second charge, a mandatory minimum of five years, might not have been applied if Baldwin were not a celebrity and if his accident had not attracted international media coverage. The elevated second charge was eventually dropped after his lawyers argued that he was being incorrectly charged with a version of the law that was not passed until months after the shooting, meaning that if he is found guilty, he will face a maximum of 18 months in prison. On February 23, he pleaded not guilty to involuntary manslaughter.

Health and dieting
Baldwin adopted a vegan diet in 2011. In 2019, he authored an article for CNN supporting the EAT Lancet report and recommended a plant-based diet due to global environmental issues.

Political views
Baldwin is a Democrat and endorsed Barack Obama in his two presidential campaigns. He serves on the board of People for the American Way. He is an animal rights activist and a staunch supporter of PETA, for which he has done work that includes narrating the video entitled Meet Your Meat. Baldwin lent his support to the Save the Manatee Club by donating his time to record several public service announcements for the group, which had contacted him following his role in "The Bonfire of the Manatees", an episode of The Simpsons in which he was the voice of a biologist working to save the endangered mammals. Baldwin also gave his support for Farm Sanctuary's Adopt A Turkey Project and stated, "At least 46 million turkeys suffer heartbreaking fear and pain before being killed each and every Thanksgiving..."

During his appearance on the comedy late night show Late Night with Conan O'Brien on December 11, 1998, eight days before President Bill Clinton was to be impeached, Baldwin said, "If we were in another country ... we would stone Henry Hyde to death and we would go to their homes and kill their wives and their children. We would kill their families, for what they're doing to this country." Baldwin later apologized for the remarks, and the network explained that it was meant as a joke and promised not to re-run it.

Baldwin said in a 2006 interview with The New York Times that if he did become involved in electoral politics, he would prefer to run for Governor of New York. When asked if he was qualified for the office, Baldwin responded that he considered himself more qualified than California Governor Arnold Schwarzenegger. On December 21, 2011, Baldwin, addressing speculation, said he was abandoning plans to run for mayor of New York City and would instead continue in his role on 30 Rock. That April, he suggested he might change his mind, saying, "Let's see what things are like in 2014. I would love to do it."

In February 2009, Baldwin spoke out to encourage state leaders to renew New York's tax break for the film and television industry, stating that if the "tax breaks are not reinstated into the budget, film production in this town is going to collapse and television production is going to collapse and it's all going to go to California".

During the 63rd Primetime Emmy Awards in 2011, Baldwin was slated to appear in a taped skit. However, the producers of the show cut a portion of the skit containing a reference to Rupert Murdoch and the News International phone hacking scandal. Baldwin subsequently boycotted the Emmy Awards and requested that his entire appearance be removed from the broadcast. Producers complied and he was replaced with Leonard Nimoy.

References

Further reading

External links

 
 
 
 
 
 
 
 Alec Baldwin's Charity Work
 

1958 births
Living people
Alec
People from Amityville, New York
People from Massapequa, New York
Male actors from New York (state)
Comedians from New York (state)
Catholics from New York (state)
American game show hosts
American male comedians
American male film actors
American male stage actors
American male television actors
American male voice actors
American people of English descent
American people of French descent
American people of Irish descent
American podcasters
American animal rights activists
Classical music radio presenters
HuffPost writers and columnists
Method actors
MSNBC people
New York (state) Democrats
People for the American Way people
People charged with manslaughter
Best Musical or Comedy Actor Golden Globe (television) winners
Canadian Screen Award winners
Outstanding Performance by a Lead Actor in a Comedy Series Primetime Emmy Award winners
Outstanding Performance by a Male Actor in a Comedy Series Screen Actors Guild Award winners
Outstanding Performance by a Supporting Actor in a Comedy Series Primetime Emmy Award winners
Tisch School of the Arts alumni
Berner High School alumni
George Washington University alumni
Lee Strasberg Theatre and Film Institute alumni
20th-century American comedians
20th-century American male actors
21st-century American comedians
21st-century American male actors